Omphaliodes is a monotypic moth genus in the family Anthelidae described by Felder in 1874. Its only species, Omphaliodes obscura, described by Francis Walker in 1856, is found in Australia.

References

Moths described in 1856
Anthelidae
Monotypic moth genera